This is the list of record labels from Estonia.

References 

 
Estonia
Record labels